The Fones House is a historic house at 902 West 2nd Street in Little Rock, Arkansas.  It is a -story brick building, topped by a steeply pitched gable roof with iron cresting at the top.  Windows are set in round-arch or segmented-arch openings, with decorative hoods.  The front facade has a single-story porch extending across it, supported by bracketed posts, and has a balcony with a decorative railing.  The house was built in 1878 by Daniel G. Fones, a veteran of the American Civil War and a prominent local hardware dealer.

The house was listed on the National Register of Historic Places in 1975.

See also
National Register of Historic Places listings in Little Rock, Arkansas

References

Houses on the National Register of Historic Places in Arkansas
Italianate architecture in Arkansas
Houses completed in 1878
Houses in Little Rock, Arkansas
National Register of Historic Places in Little Rock, Arkansas